Mon Bandhibi Kemone is the third studio album by Indian singer-songwriter Sahana Bajpaie. It was released on 27 September 2016 by Hindustan Records Inreco from Kolkata, India. This album arranged by some Bengali folk songs collection around the country and music composed by Samantak Sinha and Satyaki Banerjee.

Track listing

Personnel
 Mal Darwin
 Idris rahman

References

External links
 Albums of Sahana Bajpaie 
 Mon Bandhibi Kemone at iTunes
 Mon Bandhibi Kemone at Google Play
 Mon Bandhibi Kemone at Last.fm

2016 albums
Sahana Bajpaie albums
Bengali-language albums